Phil Lowe is an American author most noted for his book Waltzing in Triolet.

Career
Now an author at the age of 84, Lowe had already spent the greater part of his life in the work force. Lowe was born into a religions family. By the time he got 12, he started questioning the orthodox beliefs.

Lowe's father retired early and was in poor health. This lead Lowe to start working on the weekends as well as evening, part-time, in order to be able to complete his high school. As a result, he saw the perspective of the labour and the work force before any formal education. When he got out of the high school, he got a job in an X-ray department where worked in the dark room and had to bring patients on wheel chairs to be X-rayed. He dated and married colleague at this job. After he got married, he was drafted in the army. He joined the United States Army and went to the Chaplains Assistance School after his basic training was completed. He then became an assistant to Chaplain Merlin R Carothers who helped him further in finding the answers to his questions. After retirement Chaplin Carothers started the Praise Foundations in Escondido CA that has distributed thousands of books across the country to Jails and prisons. His most read book, Prison to Praise, has sold over a million. Caothers passed away in November 2013 and his wife, Mary, continued as director of the Foundation of Praise.

After he completed his tenure with the military, he spent the next 36 years of his life making a living as salesman and later sales manager in the field of industrial tools. He observed how business world was harbouring materialism. This renewed his old questions about the purpose of life. He was eventually introduced to nature photography by a friend which he took upon as a hobby. As he captured the images of nature from various trails, he realized that he had been reading the book that the Creator wrote. He published this compilation in his book, Waltzing in Triolet, which became highly notable.

Books
Waltzing in Triolet. Xlibris Us, 9 September 2008.
Say it a Different Way.
Fishing for Snakes and Baking Apple Pies.
Stalking Awareness.

References

American writers